This is a list of Swedish television related events from 1985.

Events
4 May - The 30th Eurovision Song Contest is held at the Scandinavium in Gothenburg. Norway wins the contest with the song "La det swinge", performed by Bobbysocks!.

Debuts

Television shows

Ending this year

Births

Deaths

See also
1985 in Sweden

References